The Galena River is an  stream in northern Indiana in the United States. Just after it crosses the state boundary into Three Oaks Township in Berrien County, Michigan, it is joined from the east by Spring Creek to form the South Branch Galien River. After becoming the Galien River in Michigan, the river ultimately flows to Lake Michigan in New Buffalo.

History
The river was named after René Bréhant de Galinée, a French missionary and explorer. In Michigan the name was changed to Galien River by legislative action in 1829, and presumably the Indiana Galena River tributary has the same etymology.

Watershed
In Indiana, the watershed remains relatively undeveloped; the two principal land uses are forest and agriculture. There are no large urbanized areas in the watershed. In comparison to other watersheds along the Lake Michigan coastal area, the Galena River has not been significantly impacted by human influence,

Within Indiana, the Galena River watershed is located within the physiographic unit known as the Valparaiso Morainal Area. The Valparaiso Moraine, located south of the Lacustrine Plain, is an arc-shaped moraine complex that parallels the southern shore of Lake Michigan. The moraine divides LaPorte County into northern and southern drainage areas. The area north drains into Lake Michigan; south of the moraine water drains to the Kankakee River. Numerous kettle lakes sit on the moraine. Land use in the watershed is principally forest and agriculture.

Ecology
The Galena River originates from two wetland sources, the  Galena Wetland Conservation Area and a  prairie fen called the Springfield Fen Nature Preserve, which join to form the river. Typical presettlement vegetation consisted of extensive forests, specifically oak-hickory forests in uplands, and beech or northern swamp forest in wetlands, although today most of the old growth forests have been harvested.

Pollution
In 2009, Escherichia coli exceeded water quality standards at eight of nine sampling sites. The most common sources of E. coli are livestock operations, failing septic systems, illicit sewage connections, and combined sewer overflows. The Indiana Department of Natural Resources has designated the Galena River as a salmonid stream, which requires a higher level of water quality standards.

See also
List of rivers of Indiana
Galien River

References

External links
 Galena River Watershed in Indiana Lake Michigan Coastal Management Program
 Galena River Watershed TMDL 
 Saves the Dunes non-profit conservation organization

Rivers of Michigan
Rivers of Indiana
Rivers of LaPorte County, Indiana
Rivers of Berrien County, Michigan
Tributaries of Lake Michigan